Secretaria o mujer  is a Mexican telenovela produced by Telesistema Mexicano (now Televisa) in 1960.

Plot 
The story of a man who falls in love with his secretary, but can not recognize.

Cast 
 Rafael Banquells
 Patricia Morán
 Tony Carbajal
 Dalia Íñiguez

References 

1960 telenovelas
Mexican telenovelas
Televisa telenovelas
Television shows set in Mexico City
1960 Mexican television series debuts
1960 Mexican television series endings
Spanish-language telenovelas